Irene was a sternwheel steamboat of the Puget Sound Mosquito Fleet and was active in the early 1900s.

Career
Irene was assigned to routes on southern Puget Sound, including runs out of the state capital Olympia, Washington.  Other vessels running at the same time and on similar routes included the sternwheelers Capital City and City of Shelton, and the small propeller driven vessels Prince, Blue Star, and Sophie.

References
 Affleck, Edwin L, ed. A Century of Paddlewheelers in the Pacific Northwest, the Yukon, and Alaska, Alexander Nicholls Press, Vancouver, BC (2000) 
 Findlay, Jean Cammon and Paterson, Robin, Mosquito Fleet of Southern Puget Sound, (2008) Arcadia Publishing 

1898 ships
Steamboats of Washington (state)
Passenger ships of the United States
Sternwheelers of Washington (state)